The West Coast Eagles are an Australian rules football team from Perth, Western Australia. It was founded in 1986, and had its first season in the Victorian Football League (VFL) the following year. The VFL was renamed the Australian Football League (AFL) in 1990 due to it being a national competition. Since entering the AFL, the West Coast Eagles have had six senior coaches, as well as Jaymie Graham, who filled in for Adam Simpson for one game.

In 2019, the West Coast Eagles joined the Western Australian Football League (WAFL) for the first time. They were forced to withdraw from that league in 2020 due to the AFL creating a rule that AFL-listed players cannot play in any state-based leagues, in response to the COVID-19 pandemic. West Coast have since rejoined the WAFL in 2021. West Coast's WAFL team has had two senior coaches.

In 2020, the West Coast Eagles joined the AFL Women's. West Coast's AFLW team has had three senior coaches.

To qualify for this list, a coach must have coached the club in any regular season match or finals match. Pre-season matches, exhibition matches and other types of matches are not included.

Key

VFL/AFL
Note: Statistics are correct as of round 15 of the 2021 AFL season.

WAFL
Note: Statistics are correct as of round 12 of the 2021 WAFL season.

AFL Women's
Note: Statistics are correct as of the end of the 2021 AFL Women's season.

References

Coaches

West Coast Eagles coaches
West Coast Eagles coaches
West Coast Eagles coaches